Sphaeromias is a genus of biting midges in the family Ceratopogonidae. There are at least four described species in Sphaeromias.

Species
 Sphaeromias albomarginatus Curtis
 Sphaeromias bifidus Wirth & Grogan, 1979
 Sphaeromias gilvus Grogan, 2022
 Sphaeromias longipennis (Loew, 1861)

References

Further reading

External links

 

Ceratopogonidae
Chironomoidea genera